Maurolicus amethystinopunctatus is a species of ray-finned fish in the genus Maurolicus. It lives in deep-water environments in the Northeast Atlantic Ocean.

References 

Fish described in 1838
Sternoptychidae
Taxa named by Anastasio Cocco
Fish of the North Atlantic